Aspen Peak is a regional magazine that was founded by Niche Media's Jason Binn. Niche Media was later renamed GreenGale Publishing. The publication primarily targets Aspen's most affluent residents and visitors. Niche Media was founded by Jason Binn in 1992. In 2010, Binn sold Niche Media to GreenGale Publishing, formerly known as Greenspun Media Group. He stepped down as CEO and went on to become Chief Advisor to Gilt Group Chairman Kevin Ryan 
and CEO and Founder of DuJour. GreenGale was acquired by Modern Luxury in 2017.

Profile
Aspen Peak was first published in July 2004. The magazine attempts to cover the best that Aspen has to offer in the worlds of art, beauty, business, culture, dining, entertainment, fashion, interior design, jewelry and watches, nightlife, philanthropy, politics, real estate, sports, and travel, plus, of course, the inside scoop on gossip, society, and the Colorado social scene. It also features local trendsetters as some of their writing staff who explore all the mountain community has to offer.

Published twice a year, once in the summer/fall and once in the winter/spring, serving as Aspen's own coffee table book. Erin Lentz served as the editor-in-chief of the magazine.

References

External links
 

Biannual magazines published in the United States
Local interest magazines published in the United States
Magazines established in 2004
Magazines published in Colorado
2004 establishments in Colorado